Moby (born 1965) is an American electronic musician and DJ

Moby or MOBY may refer to:

People
Moby Benedict (born 1935), American baseball player and University of Michigan head coach

Arts, entertainment and media
Moby (album), the musician's 1992 debut album
 Moby, a bird enemy in Zelda 2: The Adventure of Link
 Moby the Robot, a character on the educational website BrainPop

Organisations
Moby Media Group, the largest media company in Afghanistan
Moby Lines, an Italian shipping company
Moby Project, a collection of public-domain lexical resources

Other uses
Moby Arena, a basketball arena in Fort Collins, Colorado
Marine Optical Buoy (MOBY), part of an ocean color observation system

See also
Mobi (disambiguation)
Moby Dick (disambiguation)